Kivitoo is an abandoned Inuit community and a former whaling station on the northeast shore of Baffin Island in Nunavut, Canada.

History
In the early 20th century, the Sabellum Trading Company established a post at Kivitoo to service the whalers who would anchor there to flense carcasses. The post was abandoned in 1926.

Kivitoo (qivittu) (FOX-D) is also a former Distant Early Warning Line and is currently a North Warning System site. Because of a nearby small coastal plain, a short airstrip was built during early operation of FOX-D.

The residents of Kivitoo were evacuated to Qikiqtarjuaq in the 1963, purportedly for their safety, after three residents of the community were killed in a collapse of the ice under their igloos. However, the town was never resettled afterward, as the remaining structures in the community had been demolished by authorities by the time residents tried to return.

The evacuation and destruction of Kivitoo is the subject of Zacharias Kunuk's 2018 documentary film Kivitoo: What They Thought of Us.

References

External links 
 Photo, 2008

Whaling stations in Canada
Whaling in Canada
Former populated places in the Qikiqtaaluk Region